The Great Western Hotel is the oldest purpose-built hotel in Newquay, Cornwall. The hotel was originally designed by the Cornish architect Silvanus Trevail and first opened in April 1879. The hotel is built in a prominent position overlooking Great Western Beach.

The hotel has 66 rooms, some with sea-views.

History 
In December 1877, the local newspaper reported that the owner, had commenced building the hotel, near Newquay railway station, 

The Great Western Railway gave £2,000 towards the building of the hotel. In January 1879 the hotel was completed and it officially opened on 7 April 1879.  It was the first in a string of hotels designed to appeal to the renewed interest in Cornwall as a winter resort for the middle classes.

Royal Visit 
On a tour of Cornwall in May 1926, The Prince (Edward VIII) met the Duchy tenants at the hotel, and took tea with them in company with Sir Walter Peacock, Mr. Webster, Mr. Stainer, Duchy stewards.

Architecture  

The original 1879 building resembled a large country house with pitched roofs, gable ends and attic windows.    In 1931 the original modest two storey gabled building was altered beyond recognition to the current symmetrical art-deco style building, consisting of three storeys with smooth external render, painted frontages, symmetrical sash windows and rusticated quoin detailing to corners.

The Hotel is recognised as a historic building and is recorded on The Historic Environment Record of Cornwall.

Great Western Beach 
Before the railway came to Newquay in 1876, the beach was known as Bothwick Sands. It wasn't until the Great Western Hotel was built in 1879, (overlooking the beach) that it was gradually became known as Great Western Beach, although on many Ordnance Survey maps and holiday guides until the 1960's both names were mentioned. Despite the name being linked to the hotel, the beach is a public amenity.

References 

Hotels in Cornwall
Newquay
Hotels established in 1879
Hotel buildings completed in 1879
1879 establishments in England
Silvanus Trevail buildings